Events from the year 1516 in India.

Events
 Portuguese commander Dom Joao de Monoy entered the Mahim Creek and defeated the commander of the Mahim Fort.
 Church of Our Lady of Light is built in Chennai
 Varahanatha Temple a Hindu temple complex is established in Jajpur

Births
 Gusainji, Hindu guru is born in Charnat

Deaths

See also

 Timeline of Indian history

References